Ligeti is a Hungarian surname. Notable persons with the surname include:

 András Ligeti (1953-2021), Hungarian violinist and conductor
 Antal Ligeti (1823–1890), Hungarian landscape painter
 Eva Ligeti (born 1950), Canadian lawyer and the first Environmental Commissioner of Ontario
 György Ligeti (1923–2006), Hungarian composer
 Lajos Ligeti (1902–1987), Hungarian orientalist and philologist
 Lukas Ligeti (born 1965), son of György Ligeti and composer/percussionist
 Miklós Ligeti (1871–1944), Hungarian sculptor

See also 
 Ligeti Ridge, an undersea ridge in the Southern Ocean
 Liget
 Ted Ligety

Hungarian-language surnames